Mood of the Day is 2016 South Korean film starring Moon Chae-won and Yoo Yeon-seok.

Plot 
Kim Jae-hyun (Yoo Yeon-seok) is a sports manager and former talented basketball player. His only wish is to send a novice and promising player Kang Chul to America. To fulfill his wish, he must head to Busan to find and convince Kang Chul. Meanwhile, Bae Soo-jung (Moon Chae-won) works in an advertising agency and must also travel to Busan for a business trip. The two meet on the KTX train and spend 24 hours in the unfamiliar city of Busan, South Korea.

Cast
Moon Chae-won as Soo-jung
Yoo Yeon-seok as Jae-hyun
 Jo Jae-yoon as Kang
Kim Seul-gi
Park Min-woo
Lee Yeon-doo as Bo-kyung
Kang Soo-jin
Lee Un-jung
 Jo Woo-jin as Agency junior

Reception
A review in HanCinema described the characters as 'sort of unpleasant' and was generally critical towards most aspects of the film.

References

External links
 Mood of the Day at the Korean Movie Database

2016 films
South Korean romantic comedy films
2016 romantic comedy films
Showbox films
2010s South Korean films
2010s Korean-language films